Thiruvambadi Thamban is a 2012 Indian Malayalam-language action thriller film starring Jayaram and Haripriya in lead roles, directed by M. Padmakumar and written by S. Suresh Babu. It also marks the debut of Kannada actor Kishore in Malayalam. It also has  Nedumudi Venu, Samuthirakani and Jagathy Sreekumar in supporting roles.

Plot 

Thiruvambadi Thamban Tharakan hails from a family that have been supplying elephants for temple processions for years. He is given company by Anjali who is a Brahmin girl. On the way back to Kerala from the Gajamela at Sonepur, Thamban's father Mathan happens to confront Shaktivel in Madurai. Shaktivel is a cruel politician and landlord and Mathan fails to understand that he rules the place and accidentally kills his younger brother Shiva. Soon, in a fast tracked series of events, Shaktivel and his men go in search for Mathan  to avenge Shiva's death. Thamban follows a never ending travail of son trying to save Mathan from an extremely dangerous enemy.

Cast

Production
The movie was launched by Mammootty in Kerala. This movie reprises the entire crew of their previous hit Shikkar with a single change of Jayaram playing the lead.

The first schedule comprising the lead cast was filmed in Bihar where the big Gajamela at Sonepur, Bihar was filmed for the movie. The second schedule started from 27 November at Thrissur in which Thambi Ramaiah and Kishore joined the crew marking their debut in Malayalam films.
Sneha was initially cast for the film but she later stepped out of the film to allocate dates for Kochadaiyaan and 2 more projects in Tamil and Telugu respectively. She was replaced by Kannada actress Haripriya.

Reception

Thiruvambaadi Thambaan was released to mixed and positive reviews. It turned out to be a family entertainer. Jayaram and Jagathy Sreekumar role was good

Awards

References

External links
 

2012 films
2010s Malayalam-language films
2012 action drama films
Indian action drama films
Films directed by M. Padmakumar
Films scored by Ouseppachan
Films shot in Thrissur